The Biblioteca Pública do INEP is the national library of Guinea-Bissau and it is located in Bissau. It is also the biggest public library in the country and serves as library of the Universidade Amílcar Cabral.

It was founded in 1984 and inherited the library catalog of the colonial library in Portuguese Guinea.

It is part of the National Research Institute Instituto Nacional de Estudos e Pesquisa (INEP).

The american corner library at the INEP was opened in 2011. With its next embassy located in Dakar, Senegal, it is the only public American presence in the country.

The rich cultural patrimony of Guinea-Bissau, is hold together in this first library of the country. 

Currently, a digitization project and training programme of the CPLP supports document conservation and electronic cataloging.

See also 
 Arquivos Históricos Nacionais da República da Guiné-Bissau
 List of national libraries

References

Bibliography
  

Guinea Bissau
Libraries in Guinea-Bissau
Buildings and structures in Bissau
Libraries established in 1984
1984 establishments in Guinea-Bissau